Bobbichthys is an extinct genus of ray-finned fish that lived in what is now Chile during the Oxfordian stage of the Late Jurassic epoch.

See also

 List of prehistoric bony fish

References

Crossognathiformes
Late Jurassic fish